Leontius or Leontios (died 705) was a Byzantine emperor.

Leontius or Leontios may also refer to:

 Leontius of Antioch or Leontius the Eunuch (4th century), Patriarch of Antioch 344–358
 Leontius (usurper) (died 488), Byzantine usurper
 Leontius of Byzantium (485–543), Byzantine theological writer
 Leontius II (archbishop of Bordeaux) (r. 542–564)
 Leontius (archbishop of Lyon) (early 6th century)
 Leontius of Jerusalem (6th century), Byzantine theological writer historically confused with Leontius of Byzantium
 Leontios of Neapolis (7th century), Byzantine theological writer
 Łewond (fl. late 8th century), Armenian priest and historian
 Leontius of Damascus (fl. late 8th century), Syrian monk and writer
 Leontius of Alexandria (11th century), Greek Patriarch of Alexandria 1052–1059
 Leontius of Constantinople (died after 1190), Ecumenical Patriarch of Constantinople 1189
 Leontius Pilatus (died 1366), Greek Calabrian scholar
 Saint Leontius of Monemvasia (1377–1452) Greek Orthodox ascetic
 Leontius (Turkevich) (1876–1965), Metropolitan of the North American Diocese of the Russian Orthodox Church 1950–1965

See also
 Saint Leontius (disambiguation)